Indian Institute of Science Education and Research, Mohali (IISER Mohali) is an autonomous public university established in 2006 at Mohali, Punjab, India. It is one of the seven Indian Institutes of Science Education and Research (IISERs), established by the Ministry of Human Resources and Development, Government of India, to research in frontier areas of science and to provide science education at the undergraduate and postgraduate level. It was established after IISER Pune and IISER Kolkata and is recognised as an Institute of National Importance by the Government of India. It promote research in various fields of science.

History
The institute was approved by The Planning Commission in New Delhi in July 2006 and land was provided by The Punjab State government. The foundation stone of IISER Mohali was laid on 27 September 2006 by the former Prime Minister of India, Manmohan Singh. The Computing Facility of IISER Mohali was inaugurated on 3 September 2007 by T. Ramasami (Secretary, Department of Science and Technology). The Earth-breaking ceremony for IISER boundary wall was held on 29 December 2008 at the proposed campus site in Knowledge City, Sector 81, S.A.S. Nagar. The ceremony was performed by N. Sathyamurthy, the founding director of the institute.

C.N.R. Rao inaugurated the Chemistry Research Laboratory on 8 April 2009. The Central Analytical Facility of IISER Mohali has been inaugurated in March 2010. Initially, the institute started its working from a transit campus in Mahatma Gandhi State Institute of Public Administration (MGSIPA), Chandigarh. In March 2010, the institute started shifting to its permanent campus in The Knowledge City at Sector 81 with the opening of Central Analytical Facility (CAF) and completed the shifting in May 2013 by shutting operations in MGSIPAP complex, Sector 26, Chandigarh.

Academics

Academic Programs 

The institute offers the following programs:
Integrated Master's level (B.S.-M.S.): Admission to this program is after 10+2 years of school training and is done through the IISERs Joint Admissions Committee.
Integrated Doctoral Program (Int. Ph.D.): Integrated Ph.D. involves a master's degree (M.S.) followed by a doctorate (Ph.D.). Students after three years of undergraduate education can join the program.
Doctoral Program (Ph.D.): IISER Mohali has a separate doctoral program, in hard sciences or in the Humanities & Social Sciences Department, which requires a master's degree as qualification.

Admissions
Admission is done through 3 channels.

1. KVPY Channel

2. JEE Advance Channel

3. SCB Channel

Students applying through SCB have to be in the top 20 percentile scorers of their respective board examination (+2 level). After qualifying this Eligibility, students have to appear for Common IISER Aptitude Test, through the score of this test, students are allotted their preferred IISER.

Reputation and Rankings

The National Institutional Ranking Framework (NIRF) ranked it 40 overall in 2021.

Organization and administration

Departments
IISER Mohali is currently having six departments:
 Department of Physical Sciences
 Department of Chemical Sciences
 Department of Mathematical Sciences
 Department of Biological Science
 Department of Earth Science
 Department of Humanities and Social Sciences

Facilities
 NMR Research Facility (NMR)
 X-ray Facility - X-ray Diffraction Crystallograph
Cell Culture Facility
Animal house
Atomic Force microscope
Laser Raman and AFM Facility-Raman Infrared spectroscope
Circular Dichroic Spectrometer
Atmospheric Chemistry Facility
Computing Facility
Scanning Electron Microscopy
DC Sputtering 
PLD Machine
Cryostat
Dilution refrigerator
Liquid Helium Facility
Liquid Nitrogen Facility
FemtoLaser facility
Proton Transfer Reaction Mass Spectrometer (PTR-MS)
Laser micro-Raman spectroscope
Single Crystal X-ray Diffractometer
Crystal Growth Laboratory
PPMS
SQUID
Tetra and mono arc furnace
Tube furnace

Conferences held

7th JNOST Conference: 15–18 December 2011
History of Chemistry in India, 2013
Conference on Nonlinear Systems and Dynamics, 2013
 ICTS program: Knot theory and its Applications, 10–20 December 2013.
43rd National Seminar on Crystallography: 28–30 March 2014
32nd meeting of the Astronomical Society of India (ASI): 20–22 March 2014
International Workshop "Knots, Braids and Topology", 15–17 October 2014 
International Workshop "ATMW: Lattices--Geometry and Dynamics", 17–22 December 2014 
National Conference on Ethology and Evolution (30 October to 1 November 2015)
International Conference on Gravitation and Cosmology (ICGC) 2015
Conference on Nonlinear Systems and Dynamics, 2015
 30th Annual Conference of the Ramanujan Mathematical Society, 15–17 May 2015.
GIAN course on "Quantum Criticality in Heavy Fermions: an Experimental Perspective", 22–28 March 2018
National Conference On Quantum Condensed Matter, 25–27 July 2018 
9th International Conference on Gravitation and Cosmology, 10–13 December 2019

Student life

Amenities

 Health Centre
 Counseling Service
 Accommodation & Transport including visitors hostel
World Class Library of 8 levels
Sports Complex complete with two courts each for basketball, tennis, and volleyball
Cricket cum Football ground in the stadium which has a seating capacity of 1000
Computer Centre with High-Performance Scientific Computing cluster
Various labs
Gym

National Science Day celebrations
National Science Day celebrations on 28 February are a regular feature at IISER Mohali, every year. Invitations are sent to schools in  Mohali, Chandigarh, Panchkula and nearby areas. 
The focus of the day is on science and mathematics demonstrations prepared by IISER Mohali students and faculty members. A large number of schools send teams for inter-school competitions such as science quizzes, group discussions, treasure hunt, junkyard wars, poster presentation held on this day. Other non-competitive events such as documentary screening, anti-superstition demonstrations, etc. are also held. The day usually ends with a 'panel discussion' in which the school students ask science-related questions to a panel of faculty members of IISER Mohali. 
Since 2015, the Science Day celebrations have been shifted to 27 September, IISER Mohali's Foundation Day, as this date is more convenient for school students in the region.

Opportunity Cell
The Opportunity Cell was first proposed by the Student Representative Council, in October 2011 as a joint student-faculty
body to provide guidance to students about research and job opportunities. In the year 2012−13, the opportunity cell established a summer
research and internship programme with National Centre for Biological Sciences (NCBS), Bangalore, Connexios Life sciences  and Lucid Software Limited (Lucid). It also organised various seminars such as 
"Alternative Careers in Science", "Research Opportunities at University of St Andrews" etc. Currently the cell disseminates information about
summer research programmes, PhD positions and research oriented jobs.
Website

Magazine
Manthan, IISER Mohali's student magazine was revived in the summer of 2018 after a long gap. Six editions, along with a lockdown Life in Quarantine edition, have been published since its revival.

Clubs
1. Robotics Club
2. Biology Discussion Forum (BDF)
3. Infinity - Math club 
4. Phi@i - Physics club 
5. Curie Club - Chemistry.
6. Astronomy club 
7. Lumiére - Photography 
8. Itehad - Dance 
9. Aria - Music 
10. Ambient - Environment club 
11. Miles - Running/Marathon
12. DarPan - Drama 
13. Literary and Debating Society(LDS)
14. Rang - Art club 
15. IISER Mohali Quiz Club (IMQC) 
16. Turning Club - Coding 
17. Movie club 
18. IEC - Entrepreneurship 
19. Adventure Sports club (It's not adventure *and* sports) - Trekking and 
stuff 
20. Gaming club
21. IMLC - IISER Mohali LGBTQ collective.

Notable people

Current faculty
 Inder Bir Singh Passi, Bhatnagar Prize winning Mathematician
 Anand Kumar Bachhawat, Geneticist and Biochemist
 Kausik Chattopadhyay, N-Bios laureate
 Kapil Hari Paranjape, Bhatnagar Prize winning Mathematician
 Sudeshna Sinha, Physicist
 Anu Sabhlok, Architect and a well known geographer and feminist scholar
 Debi Prasad Sarkar, Bhatnagar Prize winning biochemist

Former Faculty
 Meera Nanda, Historian and Philosopher of Science
 Narayanasami Sathyamurthy, Bhatnagar Prize winning Chemist and President of Chemical Research Society of India. He was the director of IISER Mohali from 2007 to 2017

References

External links
 

2007 establishments in Punjab, India
Mohali
Chemical research institutes
Research institutes established in 2007
Research institutes in Punjab, India
Education in Mohali